Svinevoll is a small village in the local area of Våle in Vestfold, Norway. Historically, Svinevoll was a transportation hub for materials like timber and farm goods such as milk and corn, thanks to the railroad that linked Svinevoll to other larger cities. Timber production continues to play a part in the Svinevoll economy.

Villages in Vestfold og Telemark